Tikos is a municipality in Somogy county, Hungary. The city's coat of arms is a golden lion holding a stock of wheat against an azure background. Below the shield is a garland.

The postal code of Tikos is 8731. The village is located at the foot of Lake Balaton, about 180 km (110 mi) southeast of Budapest.

History
According to László Szita the settlement was completely Hungarian in the 18th century.

External links 
 Street map (Hungarian)

References 

Populated places in Somogy County